Lawrence Chou is a Hong Kong-Canadian singer and actor.

Profile

Music
Born in Hong Kong and raised in Vancouver, Chou developed a strong passion for music since he was a little kid. With his exceptional vocal talent, Chou won numerous singing contests in Vancouver and eventually earned a record deal with BMG in 1998. With two EPs and three LPs to his name, Chou quickly established himself as one of the brightest young singers in Taiwan, and was awarded the Best Male Newcomer award in 1998 by Channel V – the equivalent of MTV in Asia. Chou further revealed his musical talent as a producer and co-producer on many different albums for other artists or band since 1999, including highly acclaimed Mavis Fan's Jazz album, ASOS's Rock album, and finished release his own independent music group the album (Fuluju – Fukulukuju) in 2003, and won the Best Electronic Music Album awards in China 2004.

Films
Chou made his debut cameo in an omnibus film Heroes in Love in 2001 and quickly won the heart of the Hong Kong audience. Immediately afterwards, he collaborated with the director of Heroes in Love (radio celebrity Gi See Gu Bi) once more and played the lead character in Merry-Go-Round earning himself a nomination for Best Newcomer at the 2002 Hong Kong Film Awards.

In 2005 Chou played one of the 5 protagonists in the Hong Kong action film Dragon Squad

In 2007 Chou co starred with Byron Mann, Tzi Ma and Eric Tsang in the Canadian Triad mini-series Dragon Boys as the main antagonist Movie Star. This also is his most known appearance in a Canadian production.

In 2017 Chou once again played an antagonist but with a minor part in the Hong Kong crime biopic Chasing the Dragon, starring Donnie Yen and Andy Lau.

Filmography
 Chasing the Dragon 3 (2020)
 Enter the Fat Dragon (2019)
 Chasing the Dragon (2017)
 Happiness (2016)
 IPCC Files 2015 (2015) (TV series)
 Karma (2015) (TV series)
 Sexpedia (2015) (TV series) episode 8
 The Borderline (2014) (TV series)
 The Challenge (2014) (Variety show)
 Twilight Online (2014)
 Aberdeen (2014)
 SDU: Sex Duties Unit (2013)
 Vulgaria (2011)
 Big Blue Lake (2011)
 Merry-Go-Round (2010)
 Ex (2010)
 Dream Home (2010)
 Anaconda Frightened (2008) – Chu Qi
 Scare 2 Die (2008)
 Forest of Death (2007) – Patrick Wong
 Happy Birthday (2007) – Danny
 Dragon Boys (2007) (TV series) – Movie Star
 Re-cycle (2006) – Lawrence
 Without Words (2006) – Kit
 Dragon Squad (2005) – Officer James Lam, INTERPOL
 AV (2005)
 Leave Me Alone (2004) – Police officer 
 Itchy Heart (2004) – Chi-Man's cousin
 The Death Curse (2003) – Keith
 Truth or Dare: 6th Floor Rear Flat (2003) – Wing
 If You Care... (2002)
 The Eye (2002) – Dr. Wah
 Merry-Go-Round (2001) – Fung
 Heroes in Love (2001) – Lawrence

Discography
曾推出唱片專輯:
1998年 
你別傻了 (周俊偉]]、劉德華合唱) (Don't Be A Fool)
我愛你 (I LOVe YOU)
國語單曲專輯 (EP) – Marry Christmas I Love You
1999年
搶救愛情 (Saving Your Love)
了不起 (The Bomb)
BMG 12週年全家福演唱會主題曲 – 123木頭人
國語合唱曲 – 愛在捉摸不定時
2000年
別人都在傳 (People Says)
2003年
音樂大碟 – 福祿壽之『序』
fuluju – fukulukuju
曾參與製作/ 監製唱片專輯：
1999年	
國語專輯大碟 – 了不起 (周俊偉)
2000年	
國語專輯大碟 – 麵飽堡 (虛擬歌手)
2001年	
國語專輯大碟 – 絕世名伶 (范曉萱)
國語專輯大碟 – 變態少女 (ASOS)
2003年	
音樂大碟 – 福祿壽之『序』(福祿壽)
國語專輯大碟單曲 – Dear (蘇永康)
國語單曲 –  椰子罐頭 (遊戲貓)
國語單曲 – Jones Cup (Homies)
2004年	
青春連續電視劇『天下無敵』原創主題曲、插曲、及配樂
2005年	
國語專輯大碟 – 還有別的辦法嗎？(范曉萱)
2006年
國語專輯大碟單曲 – Funky Underground (容祖兒)
2007年
電影配樂 – 電影 Scare to die/嚇死你
2008年
廣告歌 – 中國移動通訊
曾演出電影及電視劇：
2010年 11月
網上電影 – 『4夜奇谭之指甲刀人魔 』原名:指甲钳人魔 周迅 周俊偉主演 彭浩翔 監製 曾国祥 尹志文 執導
2010年 10月
電影 -『東風破』官恩娜 泰廸羅賓 苗可秀 周俊偉 主演 鄭思傑麥婉欣 執導
2010年 12月
香港電台製作之寫實電視劇『火速救兵』之高溫任務 周俊偉 惠天賜 鄭啟泰 林偉 梁慧恩 關楚耀 高皓正 彭懷安 何浚尉 主演
2010年 6月
電影 -《前度》鍾欣桐 陳偉霆 詩雅 主演 麥曦茵 執導
2010年 5月
電影 – 《維多利亞壹號》何超儀 主演 彭浩翔 執導
2009年 1月
電視節目 – now香港台《一個地球 . 新西蘭篇》周俊偉 朱真真 主持
2008年 10月
電視節目 – RTHK香港電台 《不一樣的旅遊》周俊偉 譚俊彥 梁慧恩 主持
2008年 6月 
香港電台寫實劇『512活在香港 – 在家』
2008年 4月
電影 –『六樓后座2』
2008年 3月
電影 -『Scare to die/嚇死你』
2007年 3月
電影 –『森冤』
2007年 1月
電影 –『生日快樂』
2006年 9月
國內電影 –『狂蟒驚魂』
2006年 4月
電影 – 『鬼域』
2006年 2月
電影 –『地老天荒』
2005年 10–12月
加拿大國家電視台-外語電視電影『龍在他鄉- Dragon Boys』
2005年 5月
電影 –『猛龍』
2005年 3月
電影 –『AV』
2005年 2月
電視 – 香港電視台製作之十封信『消失的人』
2004年 8月
電影 –『阿孖有難』
2004年 5月
香港電視台製作之以少林武術為主題的青春連續電視劇『天下無敵』担任男主角
2003年 9月
電影 –『古宅心慌慌』
2004年 3月
電影 -『七年很癢』
2003年 6月
電影 –『六樓后座』
2003年 6月
台灣電視偶像劇特輯 — 『沒完沒了的夏天』
2002年 9月
電影 – 『賤精先生(If You Care) 』 
2002年 5月
電影 – 『見鬼 (The Eye) 』
2002年 3月
電影 – 『戀愛行星(Tiramisu) 』
2001年 9月
電影 – 『初戀嗱喳麵 (Merry-Go-Round) 』
周俊偉憑著《初戀嗱喳麵》被提名角逐第二十一屆香港電影金像獎「最佳新演員」獎
2001年 4月
電影 – 戀愛起義《不得了》

Awards
2004年	
憑音樂大碟 – 福祿壽之『序』榮獲中國內地《第四屆華語音樂傳媒大獎》之「最佳電子音樂大獎」
2002 21st Annual Hong Kong Film Awards Nomination – Best New Artist
1999年	
榮獲Channel【V】華語榜最佳男歌手新人獎
1998年	
榮獲香港IFPI單曲銷量冠軍 (你別傻了)
榮獲馬來西亞「動感三二一」金曲獎 (我愛你)
1996 Champion in Dragon Seed Connection Echoes Karaoke Contest
1995 Champion in Melody Shake Karaoke Contest
1994 Youth Team Champion in Vancouver Miho Second Karaoke Contest
1994 Youth Team Champion in Second Annual Vancouver Talent Night Karaoke Contest
1994 Typhoon award in Second Annual Vancouver Talent Night Karaoke Contest

Timeline
1994
Participated in Vancouver Miho Second Karaoke Contest—Youth Team Champion.
Participated in Second Annual Vancouver Talent Night Karaoke Contest—Youth Team Champion.
Participated in Second Annual Vancouver Talent Night Karaoke Contest—Typhoon award.
1995
Participated in Melody Shake Karaoke Contest—Champion.
To 1997, participated in Canada Shadow Dance Troupe (加拿大影舞者舞團); publicly performing about 250 times each year.
1996
Participated in Dragon Seed Connection Echoes Karaoke Contest—Champion.
1997
Participated in BMG 10th Anniversary Concert.
Participated in Julia Peng's School Campus Tour Concert (彭佳慧校園巡迴演唱會) for 10 shows.
1998
Published own Mandarin single "Don't Be A Fool".
July, published personal first Mandarin album "I LOVe YOU".
July, duet with Andy Lau in single "Don't Be A Fool", won IFPI Singles Billboard Champion. 
September, invited to become new type shopping store Galaxy's spokesperson.
December, published second single "MARRY CHRISTMAS I LOVE YOU".
1999
Honored with Channel [V]'s 華語榜中榜 Best New Male Singer Award.
January, published second big Mandarin album "Saving Your Love".
January, shot KOBAYASHI OPTICAL (小林眼鏡) CF, became product's spokesperson.
November, published third album "Great" and took charge as Producer.
2000
May, invited to shoot electronic dictionary "酷譯典" advertisement.
June, published own first new compilation album "People Says".

References
 Lawrence Chou 周俊瑋 Official website
 Lawrence Chou 周俊瑋新浪Blog
  CBC DRAGONBOYS
 Lawrence Chou Chun-Wai Filmography

External links
 

1979 births
Canadian male actors of Hong Kong descent
Hong Kong emigrants to Canada
Hong Kong male film actors
Hong Kong male singers
Living people